Daniel Oladele Akinbiyi Oyegoke (born 3 January 2003) is an English professional footballer who plays as a right back for  club Brentford. He is a product of the Barnet and Arsenal academies and has been capped by England at youth level.

Club career

Early years 
After beginning his youth career as a forward in the Barnet Academy, Oyegoke moved to the Arsenal Academy in 2017. While at Hale End, he was converted into a right back and progressed to sign a scholarship deal at the end of the 2018–19 season. At the end of his two-year scholarship, Oyegoke elected to decline the offer of a professional contract and departed the club.

Brentford 
On 1 July 2021, Oyegoke transferred to the B team at Premier League club Brentford and signed a three-year contract, with the option of a further year, for an undisclosed fee. He made 24 B team appearances during the 2021–22 season and was an unused substitute during two first team cup matches. Oyegoke was called into the first team's 2022–23 pre-season training camp in Germany and made two friendly appearances.

On 27 July 2022, Oyegoke joined League One club Milton Keynes Dons on loan until the end of the 2022–23 season. He made 18 appearances, predominantly as a starter, before being recalled on 2 January 2023.

International career 
Oyegoke was capped by England at U16, U17, U18 and U19 level. He participated in an U19 training camp in May 2021 and was named in the squad for a pair of friendly matches in September 2021, both of which he appeared in. During the 2021–22 season, Oyegoke was a part of the U19 squad which qualified for the 2022 UEFA European U19 Championship Finals. He started in two of his five appearances at the Finals, including the victory over Israel in the Final. In September 2022, Oyegoke was named in the England U20 squad for its Costa Cálida Supercup campaign. He started in the opening match versus Chile and scored his first international goal in the 3–0 win.

Personal life 
Oyegoke is of Nigerian descent. He attended Aldenham School.

Career statistics

Honours 
England U19

 UEFA European U19 Championship: 2022

References

External links 

 
 Daniel Oyegoke at brentfordfc.com
 

2003 births
Living people
People from the London Borough of Barnet
English footballers
England youth international footballers
English sportspeople of Nigerian descent
Arsenal F.C. players
Brentford F.C. players
Black British sportspeople
Association football fullbacks
People educated at Aldenham School
Milton Keynes Dons F.C. players
English Football League players